Fisher's inequality is a necessary condition for the existence of a balanced incomplete block design, that is, a system of subsets that satisfy certain prescribed conditions in combinatorial mathematics. Outlined by Ronald Fisher, a population geneticist and statistician, who was concerned with the design of experiments such as studying the differences among several different varieties of plants, under each of a number of different growing conditions, called blocks.

Let:

  be the number of varieties of plants;
  be the number of blocks.

To be a balanced incomplete block design it is required that:

  different varieties are in each block, ; no variety occurs twice in any one block;
 any two varieties occur together in exactly  blocks;
 each variety occurs in exactly  blocks.

Fisher's inequality states simply that

 .

Proof 
Let the incidence matrix  be a  matrix defined so that  is 1 if element  is in block  and 0 otherwise.

Generalization
Fisher's inequality is valid for more general classes of designs.

Theorem: For any non-trivial PBD, .

This result also generalizes the Erdős–De Bruijn theorem:

In another direction, Ray-Chaudhuri and Wilson proved in 1975 that in a  design, the number of blocks is at least .

Notes

References
 R. C. Bose, "A Note on Fisher's Inequality for Balanced Incomplete Block Designs", Annals of Mathematical Statistics, 1949, pages 619–620.
 R. A. Fisher, "An examination of the different possible solutions of a problem in incomplete blocks", Annals of Eugenics, volume 10, 1940, pages 52–75.
 

Combinatorial design
Design of experiments
Families of sets
Statistical inequalities